Pushkov is a Russian masculine surname, its feminine counterpart is Pushkova. It may refer to
Aleksey Pushkov (born 1954), Russian  statesman and politician
Ganna Pushkova-Areshka (born 1978), Belarusian sprint canoer 
Nikolay Pushkov (1903-1981), Soviet scientist 
Sergei Pushkov (born 1964), Russian ice hockey player

Russian-language surnames